The Lamborghini Marzal is a concept car, first presented by Lamborghini at the 1967 Geneva Motor Show.

History 

Designed by Marcello Gandini of Bertone, it was created to supply Ferruccio Lamborghini with a true four-seater car for his lineup which already included the 400GT 2+2 and the Miura. Mr. Lamborghini initially viewed the creation of the Marzal as advertising rather than a production model, stating: 

The Marzal remained a one-off, though the general shape and many of the ideas would later be used in the Lamborghini Espada.

The Marzal's styling was radical at the time of its introduction, with magazine Road & Track calling it "A Bertone design so fresh that everything else looks old fashioned." It was distinguished by glazed gull-wing doors and a strong hexagonal motif throughout, including in the louvered rear window, interior trim and unique Campagnolo magnesium wheels. Other innovative styling elements included silver interior upholstery and 6 narrow S.E.V. Marchal headlamps in the thin, wedge-shaped nose.  

Several companies made die-cast models based on the Marzal, including Dinky Toys and Matchbox. Many were in other colours such as orange, despite the original show car being painted silver.

The Marzal appeared in action at a public event for the first time at the 1967 Monaco Grand Prix when Prince Rainier III, accompanied by his wife, Princess Grace, drove the car on his traditional parade lap before the start of the race. The car made a second public appearance at the 1996 Concorso Italiano in Monterey, California in honor of Carrozzeria Bertone. The Lamborghini Athon was also exhibited at this time. The car was driven by Prince Albert II during the opening ceremony of the 2018 Historic Grand Prix of Monaco.

The Marzal was located for a long time in the Bertone Design Study Museum. It sold at RM Sotheby's Villa d'Este auction on 21 May 2011 for 1,512,000 Euros including buyer's premium.

Specifications 

This engine was designed by Gian Paolo Dallara and was a split-in-half version of the 4.0L Lamborghini V12, mated to a 5-speed transaxle. It was equipped with three Weber 40 DCOE carburetors, with air intakes positioned directly behind the rear passengers' heads. The engine was mounted transversely in the rear of the car, fully behind the rear axle. The transaxle was from a Miura, with a higher final drive ratio of 5.30 to improve acceleration.

The front hood was made from aluminum with the remaining non-glazed bodywork constructed from steel. When visiting Bertone in the spring of 1967, journalist L.J.K. Setright observed that "five large blocks of metal and a moderately small anvil" had been placed in the front compartment of the Marzal in order to level the ride height from front to back.

The suspension, steering and brakes used in the Marzal were all taken from the production Miura. Suspension travel was limited compared to the Miura, due to the design of the bodywork. Bertone designed unique 14 in diameter by 6.5 inch wide magnesium centerlock wheels, made by Campagnolo. These were similar in construction to those used on the Miura and Espada, but were visually unique, with two rows of nearly-hexagonal air ducts. Pirelli Cinturato HS tires in size 205-14 were fitted.

In total,  of glass paneling was used in the Marzal, all supplied by Glaverbel. This company had previously provided Bertone with the glass used in the Alfa Romeo Carabo and the Miura's rear window. An air conditioning system was installed in order to deal with the resulting high passenger compartment temperatures.

References

Marzal
Bertone concept vehicles